Chenar may refer to:

Platanus orientalis, the chenar tree

Ardabil Province
Chenar, Ardabil, Iran
Chenar, Angut-e Gharbi, a village in Germi County
Chenar (39°07′ N 47°52′ E), Angut-e Sharqi, a village in Germi County
Chenar (39°12′ N 47°41′ E), Angut-e Sharqi, a village in Germi County
Chenar, Khalkhal, a village in Khalkhal County

Chaharmahal and Bakhtiari Province
Chenar, Kuhrang, a village in Kuhrang County
Chenar, Lordegan, a village in Lordegan County

East Azerbaijan Province
Chenar, Ajab Shir, a village in Ajab Shir County
Chenar, Meyaneh, a village in Meyaneh County

Fars Province
Chenar, Abadeh, a village in Abadeh County
Chenar Zahedan, a village in Bavanat County
Chenar, Tujerdi, a village in Bavanat County
Chenar, Darab, a village in Darab County
Chenar, Fasa, a village in Fasa County
Chenar Shahijan District, in Kazerun County
Chenar Barg, a village in Mamasani County
Chenar Shahijan, Marvdasht, a village in Marvdasht County
Chenar Pakaneh, a village in Neyriz County
Chenar, Sepidan, a village in Sepidan County
Chenar Mishavan, a village in Shiraz County

Gilan Province
Chenar, Gilan, a village in Shaft County

Hamadan Province
Chenar-e Olya, Hamadan, a village in Asadabad County
Chenar-e Sofla, Hamadan, a village in Asadabad County
Chenar, Nahavand, a village in Nahavand County

Ilam Province
Chenar Bashi, a village in Ilam County
Chenar Bashi-ye Rezaabad, a village in Ilam County
Chenar-e Allah Qoli, a village in Shirvan and Chardaval County

Isfahan Province
Chenar, Isfahan, a village in Kashan County

Kerman Province
Chenar, Kerman, a village in Shahr-e Babak County
Chenar Turan, a village in Baft County
Chenar-e Pidenguiyeh, a village in Jiroft County
Chenar-e Kaf, a village in Sirjan County

Kermanshah Province
Chenar, Eslamabad-e Gharb, a village in Eslamabad-e Gharb County
Chenar, Harsin, a village in Harsin County
Chenar, Kermanshah, a village in Kermanshah County
Chenar-e Olya, Kermanshah, a village in Kermanshah County
Chenar-e Sofla, Kermanshah, a village in Kermanshah County
Chenar-e Vosta, a village in Kermanshah County
Chenar-e Sofla, Sahneh, a village in Sahneh County

Khuzestan Province
Chenar, Khuzestan, a village in Andimeshk County

Kohgiluyeh and Boyer-Ahmad Province
Chenar Rural District, in Dana County

Kurdistan Province
Chenar, Kurdistan, a village in Saqqez County

Lorestan Province
Chenar, Dorud, Lorestan Province, Iran
Chenar, Keshvar, Lorestan Province, Iran
Chenar, Sepiddasht, Lorestan Province, Iran
Chenar, alternate name of Cham Davud, Lorestan Province, Iran
Chenar-e Bala, Lorestan Province, Iran
Chenar-e Dom Chehr Qoralivand, Lorestan Province, Iran
Chenar-e Golaban, Lorestan Province, Iran
Chenar-e Kaliab, Lorestan Province, Iran
Chenar-e Mishakhvor, Lorestan Province, Iran
Chenar-e Modvi-e Bala, Lorestan Province, Iran
Chenar-e Modvi-e Pain, Lorestan Province, Iran
Chenar-e Pain, Lorestan Province, Iran
Chenar-e Razbashi, Lorestan Province, Iran
Chenar-e Sofla, Lorestan, Lorestan Province, Iran
Chenar Bagali, Lorestan Province, Iran
Chenar Gerit, Lorestan Province, Iran
Chenar Kheyri, Lorestan Province, Iran
Chenar Khoshkeh, Lorestan Province, Iran
Chenar Khosrow, Lorestan Province, Iran
Chenar Kol, Lorestan Province, Iran
Chenar Shureh, Lorestan Province, Iran

Markazi Province
Chenar, Khomeyn, a village in Khomeyn County
Chenar, Saveh, a village in Saveh County

Qazvin Province
Chenar-e Sofla, Qazvin, Qazvin Province, Iran

Razavi Khorasan Province
Chenar, Chenaran, a village in Chenaran County
Chenar, Dargaz, a village in Dargaz County
Chenar, Fariman, a village in Fariman County
Chenar Bow, a village in Fariman County
Chenar, Kalat, a village in Kalat County
Chenar, Mahvelat, a village in Mahvelat County
Chenar, Sabzevar, a village in Sabzevar County
Chenar, Torbat-e Jam, a village in Torbat-e Jam County

Tehran Province
Chenar-e Arabha, a village in Damavand County

Zanjan Province
Chenar, Zanjan, a village in Tarom County

See also
Çınar (disambiguation), the Turkic version of the word
 Chenaran (disambiguation)
Chenaru (disambiguation)
Chenaruiyeh (disambiguation)
Dar Chenar (disambiguation)
Deh Chenar (disambiguation)